Pan-American Congress  may refer to:
 
 Congress of Panama, in 1826
 Pan-American Conference, periodic meetings of the Pan-American Union
 Pan-American Conference of Women, Baltimore 1922
 First International Conference of American States, the first such meeting, in 1889–1890

es:Conferencias Panamericanas
ja:パン＝アメリカ会議